Anastasia Vlasova may refer to:

 Anastasia Vlasova (journalist), Ukrainian photographer and journalist
 Anastasia Vlasova (skier), Russian skier
 Anastassiya Vlassova (born 1996), Kazakhstani footballer